Rolf Büttiker (born 27 June 1950) is a Swiss politician and business consultant. He was President of the Swiss Council of States for the 2005/2006 term. A member of FDP.The Liberals, he was elected to the Council of States in 1991. From 1987 to 1991, he was member of the National Council.

External links
Parliament.ch: Rolf Büttiker, Speaker of the Council of States 2005/2006 (FDP, SO)

1950 births
Living people
People from the canton of Solothurn
Free Democratic Party of Switzerland politicians
FDP.The Liberals politicians
Members of the National Council (Switzerland)
Members of the Council of States (Switzerland)
Presidents of the Council of States (Switzerland)